The Hazen-Spiller House is a historic late First Period house in Haverhill, Massachusetts.  Built c. 1724 by Richard Hazen, It is a rare example of a brick house of the time, and notable for its role in early 20th century restoration activities. The -story building is made of brick laid in English bond, with end chimneys and a central hall layout.  The house was acquired in 1911 by early preservationist William Taylor, who took notes detailing the buildings First Period features.  In 1915 Taylor sold the house to Wallace Nutting, who undertook a "restoration" that covered over some of those features and may have destroyed others.  The house was one of a series owned by Nutting and showcased in a guidebook, Chain of Picture Houses, he used to popularized colonial styles.

The house was listed on the National Register of Historic Places in 1990.

See also
National Register of Historic Places listings in Essex County, Massachusetts

References

Houses completed in 1724
Houses in Haverhill, Massachusetts
Houses on the National Register of Historic Places in Essex County, Massachusetts
1724 establishments in Massachusetts